Divya Dutta (born 25 September 1977) is an Indian actress and model. She has appeared in Hindi and Punjabi cinema, in addition to Malayalam and English-language films. She has received many awards including a National Film Award, a Filmfare Award and 2 IIFA Awards.

Dutta debuted in Hindi cinema in 1994 with the film Ishq Mein Jeena Ishq Mein Marna, which she followed up with a lead role in the 1995 drama Veergati and a string of supporting roles. She then garnered attention for playing the lead role of Zainab, a Muslim wife separated from her Sikh husband, in the 1999 Punjabi film Shaheed-e-Mohabbat Boota Singh, set against the backdrop of the 1947 Partition of India. The movie was a surprise hit, and Dutta subsequently continued to act in supporting roles. In 2004, Dutta garnered widespread critical acclaim for her role as Shabbo in the romantic drama Veer-Zaara and earned Best Supporting Actress nominations at several awards ceremonies, including Filmfare. She subsequently received recognition for her role in the 2008 comedy film Welcome to Sajjanpur, and received the IIFA Award for Best Supporting Actress for her portrayal of Jalebi in the 2009 drama film Delhi-6.

Dutta continued to establish herself with character roles in the 2011 film Stanley Ka Dabba and the 2012 drama Heroine. In 2013, she received attention for her performances in Gippi and the biographical sports drama film Bhaag Milkha Bhaag, in which she played Ishri Kaur, the sister of Milkha Singh. For her role in the latter, she received several awards and nominations, including her second IIFA Award for Best Supporting Actress. To date, she has acted in more than sixty feature films, including two international productions. In television, she played Purnima Banerjee in the serial Samvidhaan (2014). For her role in the social drama Irada (2017), Dutta was awarded the National Film Award for Best Supporting Actress. Dutta's debut performance in short films was Plus Minus, winner in the Most Popular Short Film category at the 2019 Filmfare Awards, written and directed by Jyoti Kapur Das. She has authored a book, The Stars in My Sky.

Early life
Dutta was born on 25 September 1977 in Ludhiana, Punjab. Her mother, Nalini Dutta, is a government officer and doctor who raised Dutta and her brother single-handedly following the death of her husband when Dutta was aged seven. Dutta described her as "fearless and professional" and a "fun mom at home." She took inspiration from her mother for her role as a single mother, Pappi in the 2013 drama film Gippi. She and her brother compiled a collection of their mother's poems and published them as a present to her. Dutta's maternal uncle is film director and producer Deepak Bahry.

When Dutta was young, the Punjab insurgency began and Dutta described herself as hiding behind her mother's dupatta "praying nobody shoots us." Dutta was educated at Sacred Heart Convent in Ludhiana.

Modeling career
Before venturing into cinema, she modelled for regional television commercials in her home state of Punjab. In 2001, she appeared in the music video "Romeo" by music duo Basement Jaxx, from London, England.

Acting career
Dutta made her film debut in 1994 with the film Ishq Mein Jeena Ishq Mein Marna. She followed this by playing the supporting role of Bindiya in the 1995 film Surakshaa, alongside Suniel Shetty, Aditya Pancholi, Saif Ali Khan and Sheeba. The film performed very well in the overseas markets, especially Norway and Sweden. The same year, Dutta earned her first leading role opposite Salman Khan in the 1995 drama film Veergati, portraying the role of Sandhya. However, the film became a flop at the box office.

The following year, Dutta played supporting roles in three releases- Agni Sakshi alongside Jackie Shroff, Nana Patekar and Manisha Koirala, Chhote Sarkar alongside Govinda and Shilpa Shetty, and Ram Aur Shyam. In 1997, she played small roles in Raja Ki Aayegi Baraat, alongside Rani Mukerji, as Sharda's sister and in Daava as Deepa, alongside Akshay Kumar and Raveena Tandon. Dutta had four releases in 1998, playing small roles in Gharwali Baharwali and Bade Miyan Chote Miyan, but appearing as the female lead, Milli, in the film Iski Topi Uske Sarr. However, her performance was criticised as "wooden". She also played the role of a prostitute in the Pamela Rooks drama Train to Pakistan set during the time of the partition of India, in 1947.

1999–2003: Punjabi debut and breakthrough
In 1999, Dutta made her Punjabi debut in the romantic drama Shaheed-e-Mohabbat Boota Singh, in the first of her many roles opposite Gurdas Maan. The film was also set during the 1947 Indian partition and was based on the real-life story of a Sikh Boota Singh. Dutta played his Muslim wife, Zainab, who was separated from him and pressurised by her family. It was well-received and a surprise hit at the box office. Dutta was praised for her performance, with the Tribune remarking that she is "competent in the depiction of Punjabi exuberance, as well as acute grief." She played supporting roles in the films Samar, Rajaji and Tabaahi – The Destroyer.

The following year, Dutta made her Nepali debut in the romance film Basanti, playing the role of Malati. In 2001, she also had one release, the suspense thriller Kasoor, directed by Vikram Bhatt. She played the role of Ms. Payal and dubbed the voice of non-Hindi speaking actress Lisa Ray. The film was a commercial success.

In 2002, Dutta had six releases — she made a special appearance in the Nepali film Maya Namara, and appeared in Inth Ka Jawab Patthar, playing the role of Kanchan. She played supporting roles in Shakti: The Power alongside Karisma Kapoor and Shah Rukh Khan, and in Sur – The Melody of Life. She appeared alongside Gurdas Maan and Tabu in Zindagi Khoobsoorat Hai, directed by Manoj Punj. She played the role of Durgawati Devi alongside Sunny Deol and Bobby Deol in 23rd March 1931: Shaheed, but the movie was a flop at the box office. In 2003, she ventured into comedy with Praan Jaye Par Shaan Na Jaye, playing the role of Dulari. She appeared in two ensemble movies, the family film Baghban and the war film LOC Kargil. Both were well-received, but in the latter she was described as barely having "the screen time that may be consumed in a blink." She played the role of Chatterjee's daughter in Jogger's Park and received her first nomination for the Star Guild Award for Best Actress in a Supporting Role for her performance.

2004–08: Widespread recognition

In 2004, Dutta made her breakthrough in Hindi cinema with the role of Shabbo with Yash Chopra's  romantic drama Veer-Zaara, alongside Shah Rukh Khan, Preity Zinta and Rani Mukerji. The film received widespread critical acclaim and emerged an all-time blockbuster at the box office. Dutta was widely lauded for her performance, with Aakash Gandhi describing her as "doing a fantastic job serving as the maid who's trying to join the two lovers" and critic Subhash K. Jha remarking that she "bring[s] enormous feeling." For her performance, Dutta received nominations at several award ceremonies, including her first Filmfare Award nomination for Best Supporting Actress. That same year, she also appeared in supporting roles in Murder and Agnipankh, and collaborated for a third time with director Manoj Punj in the Punjabi film Des Hoyaa Pardes. She also played lead roles in Shobhayatra and the comedy film Shaadi Ka Laddoo.

The following year, Dutta had seven releases, with appearances in Dil Ke Pechey Pechey, Naam Gum Jaayega and Dubai Return. She also appeared in Silsiilay alongside Shah Rukh Khan and Bhumika Chawla, and in the comedy Mr Ya Miss. She played Ila Bose, the sister of Subhas Chandra Bose, in the film based on his life, Netaji Subhas Chandra Bose: The Forgotten Hero, and was described as "outstanding" by film critic Subhash K. Jha. She also played the title role in Sanyogita: The Bride in Red, a Rajasthani girl struggling to control her desires in a patriarchal society. The film received rave reviews in France and won the Best Film Award at the Lyon Asian Film Festival. In 2006, Dutta appeared in a small role in Darwaaza Bandh Rakho, alongside Aftab Shivdasani and Isha Sharvani. The film underperformed at the box office. She also appeared in Umrao Jaan, and despite the film receiving mixed reviews and performing poorly at the box office, Dutta's performance was praised, with the Tribune remarking that she is "convincing," but Rediff criticised the film for underutilising her and called her "an exceptional artist...reduced to a sidekick."

Dutta made her international debut in the English Rituparno Ghosh film The Last Lear alongside Amitabh Bachchan, Preity Zinta and Arjun Rampal, playing the role of Ivy, a nurse. The film premiered at the Toronto International Film Festival. Reviews of the film were mixed, but Dutta was mostly praised for her portrayal, with Aparajita Ghosh calling her "simply superb" but Joxily John remarking that she is "wasted in a character that does not add any significant value to the proceedings." She also played supporting roles in the sports drama Apne as part of an ensemble cast including Dharmendra and Katrina Kaif, and in the dance drama Aaja Nachle alongside Madhuri Dixit. Although the former was a hit, the latter underperformed at the box office. In 2008, she played supporting roles in U Me Aur Hum alongside Ajay Devgn and Kajol, and in Summer 2007. For her performance in Welcome to Sajjanpur, she received the Star Sabse Favourite Kaun Award. She also appeared opposite Vinay Pathak in the comedy Oh, My God, which received mainly negative reviews, although Dutta's performance was branded "earnest." She played the titular role in Kahaani Gudiya Ki...True Story of a Woman and was praised for her portrayal of a Muslim woman in the Kargil War.

2009–12: Delhi-6 and international success
Dutta's first release of 2009, the Rakeysh Omprakash Mehra's drama film Delhi-6, was a box office flop and received mixed reviews. For her portrayal of the low-caste trash collector girl, Jalebi, Dutta was praised, with Taran Ardash calling her "admirable" and BehindWoods calling the supporting actors, including Dutta, "the highlight of the movie." Dutta received nominations for Best Supporting Actress at many awards ceremonies and won her first IIFA Award for Best Supporting Actress. She starred in Love Khichdi alongside Randeep Hooda and Avijit Ghosh of the Economic Times called her "among those who stand out." She also appeared in Morning Walk and her performance was described as "good" although the movie received negative reviews. Her other two releases that year were Mini Punjab and Paroksh.

In 2010, she appeared in the Punjabi film Sukhmani: Hope for Life, once again alongside Juhi Chawla and Gurdas Maan, playing the role of Reshma. For her performance, she received the PTC Punjabi Film Award for Best Actress. She played a supporting role in the Manoj Tiwari directed comedy film Hello Darling. The film received extremely negative reviews, but Dutta's performance received mixed reviews, with Joginder Tuteja calling her "okay," but NDTV calling her one of the actresses who make an impression. She also appeared in Malik Ek, based on the life of Shirdi Sai Baba, playing one of his devotees, Laxmi. The film received mostly negative reviews, but her performance received mixed reviews and was described as "efficient" by Komal Nahta. The same year, she appeared in two international ventures- director Fred Holmes' multilingual project Heart Land and the film Hisss alongside Mallika Sherawat. The film received negative reviews and was criticised for underutilising her, with Taran Ardash calling her "wasted" and Pankaj Sabnani remarking that she "doesn't have much scope."

The following year, Dutta had nine releases, making appearances in Chaloo Movie and Masti Express, as well as the Punjabi film The Lion of Punjab. Her film Haat: The Weekly Bazaar had its teasers and promo screened at the Cannes Film Festival. She played the lead role of Sanja, a woman who decides to leave her husband but maintains her dignity in the male-dominated society. The film won the Special Jury's Award at the Third Eye Asian Film Festival in Mumbai. She also played supporting roles in the comedy Mummy Punjabi, alongside Kirron Kher and My Friend Pinto, alongside Prateik Babbar and Kalki Koechlin. Her performance in the former received positive reviews, with the Daily Bhaskar branding her "the only character that stands out" and a "firebrand." However, her performance in the latter was met with mixed reviews, with Rediff stating, "Considering the oomph factor which Divya is capable of oozing on screen, it is one more opportunity lost as the all-pervading air is one of buffoonery," but with Jhinuk Sen calling her "rather endearing." She played the female lead, Minnie, in the Dev Anand film Chargesheet, which was met with highly negative reviews. However, Dutta's performance was positively received, with NDTV remarking that she "does Mini Singh to perfection." She also played lead roles in the drama Monica and the independent film Stanley Ka Dabba. In the former, she played the title role of a journalist, and the film received mixed reviews, but her performance was praised. Mahesh Bhatt remarked that Dutta "bares her soul on the screen," and Komal Nahta said, "Dutta does a fine job, conveying her fears and frustration, especially in the second half, beautifully." The film was a disaster at the box office. Stanley Ka Dabba received overwhelmingly positive reviews, and Dutta was praised for her portrayal of a teacher, with Rediff remarking that she is "sure to bring back rose-tinted memories of saccharine-oversweet teachers you couldn't get enough of," and Sonia Chopra saying "Dutta shines in her role as the sympathetic teacher." The film was a hit at the box office.

In 2012, Dutta appeared alongside Karisma Kapoor in Dangerous Ishhq, playing three characters. The film received mostly negative reviews and was a flop at the box office, although her performance was lauded, with Taran Ardash remarking, "Divya Dutta does very well, but, again, gets no scope after a point,"  and Mrigank Dhaniwala stating, "Divya Dutta does fine job in multiple roles."  Her next release, the Madhur Bhandarkar drama Heroine also received negative reviews and had a below average performance at the box office. However, her performance as Pallavi Narayan, the PR manager of a struggling actress, was highly praised, with Taran Adarsh commenting, "a special mention of Divya Dutta [in terrific form]" and Lisa Tsering remarking "the supporting actors are strong throughout, especially the smart Divya Dutta as a wily PR maven." Her performance earned her another nomination for the IIFA Award for Best Supporting Actress. Dutta also appeared in the film Overtime.

2013–present: Bhaag Milkha Bhaag and beyond
In 2013, Dutta appeared in some of the year's most critically acclaimed hits. Her first release was the Neeraj Pandey thriller heist film Special 26 alongside Akshay Kumar and Kajal Aggarwal. The film was a critical and commercial success. Her comedy turn as Shanti was praised, with Madhureeta Mukherjee commenting, "Dutta throws in laughs." Her next release was the drama Gippi, produced by Karan Johar, in which she played a single mother struggling with her victimised daughter. Dutta took inspiration from her mother for her role and received mixed reviews, with Rediff commenting, "Her acting was alright," but in.com saying, "Dutta aces the mummy act." The film was an average performer at the box office. Dutta received a nomination for the Screen Award for Best Supporting Actress for her performance. Dutta then made an appearance in the period romantic drama Lootera alongside Ranveer Singh and Sonakshi Sinha. The film was critically acclaimed and an average performer at the box office.

Dutta's next release was the biographical sports film Bhaag Milkha Bhaag, based on the life of Milkha Singh. She appeared alongside Farhan Akhtar, Sonam Kapoor and Meesha Shafi, playing the sister of Singh. The film is Dutta's biggest commercial success to date and entered the 100-crore club. The film, and her performance, were highly praised, with the Times of India branding her "outstanding," and Priya Joshi calling her "exceptional in a poignant role as his protective elder sister." For her performance, Dutta received nominations at several awards ceremonies, and eventually won her second IIFA Award. Her final release of the year was the political action thriller Zila Ghaziabad alongside Arshad Warsi and Sanjay Dutt. The film received mostly negative reviews, although Dutta was described as one of the "few quality actors."

In 2014, Dutta's first release was the horror-thriller Ragini MMS 2, a sequel to Ragini MMS, alongside Sunny Leone and Parvin Dabas. Dutta played a psychiatrist, Dr. Meera Dutta and received mixed reviews, with Madhureeta Mukherjee stating that she "stays trapped in an unconvincing role,". The film was a super hit at the box office. Her second release was the biographical film Manjunath alongside Seema Biswas and Kishore Kadam. The film received positive reviews and her performance as Anjali Mullati, the owner of a consulting company who decides to start fighting her own battle against the mafia, was praised, with Taran Ardash calling her "absolutely believable."

Dutta appeared in the 2016 thriller film Traffic alongside Manoj Bajpayee, a remake of the Malayalam film of the same name. She also appeared in successful movies like Badlapur (2015), Blackmail (2018) and Babumoshai Bandookbaaz (2017). She also acted in a short film Plus Minus (2018), which got 16 million views on YouTube and another short film The Playboy Mr. Sawhney. Plus Minus was the winner in the Most Popular Short Film category at the 2019 Filmfare Awards.

Personal life
Divya Dutta is unmarried. She wrote a memoir, Me and Ma, about her heavenly relationship with her mother. Me and Ma celebrates her mother's struggles to turn her into the woman she is today. The book was published on 10 February 2017 by Penguin Random House.

Awards and nominations

National Film Awards
 2018 – National Film Award for Best Supporting Actress – Irada

 Filmfare Awards

 2005 – Nominated – Filmfare Award for Best Supporting Actress – Veer-Zaara
 2010 – Nominated – Filmfare Award for Best Supporting Actress – Delhi-6
 2014 – Nominated – Filmfare Award for Best Supporting Actress – Bhaag Milkha Bhaag
 2020 – Won – Filmfare OTT Awards for Best Supporting Actress (Drama Series) – Special OPS

 Zee Cine Awards

 2005 – Won – Zee Cine Award for Best Actor in a Supporting Role – Female – Veer-Zaara
 2014 – Won – Zee Cine Award for Best Actor in a Supporting Role – Female – Bhaag Milkha Bhaag

 IIFA Awards

 2005 – Nominated – IIFA Award for Best Supporting Actress – Veer-Zaara
 2010 – Won – IIFA Award for Best Supporting Actress – Delhi-6
 2012 – Nominated – IIFA Award for Best Supporting Actress – Stanley Ka Dabba
 2013 – Nominated – IIFA Award for Best Supporting Actress – Heroine
 2014 – Won – IIFA Award for Best Supporting Actress – Bhaag Milkha Bhaag

 Global Indian Film Awards

 2005 – Won – GIFA Award for Best Supporting Actress – Veer-Zaara

 Apsara Film & Television Producers Guild Awards

 2004 – Nominated – Apsara Award for Best Actress in a Supporting Role – Joggers' Park
 2012 – Nominated – Apsara Award for Best Actress in a Supporting Role – Stanley Ka Dabba
 2014 – Won – Apsara Award for Best Actress in a Supporting Role – Bhaag Milkha Bhaag

 Screen Awards

 2005 – Nominated – Screen Award for Best Supporting Actress – Veer-Zaara
 2010 – Nominated – Screen Award for Best Supporting Actress – Delhi-6
 2014 – Nominated – Screen Award for Best Supporting Actress – Gippi
 2019 – Nominated – Screen Award for Best Supporting Actress – Blackmail

 Other awards

 1993 – Won – Best Actress & Best Dancer Award in Punjab Youth Festival

Filmography

Television

Web series

References

External links

 
 

1977 births
Living people
Indian film actresses
Actresses in Hindi cinema
Actresses from Ludhiana
Actresses in Punjabi cinema
Actresses in Tamil cinema
Actresses in Malayalam cinema
Actresses in Urdu cinema
20th-century Indian actresses
21st-century Indian actresses
Best Supporting Actress National Film Award winners
International Indian Film Academy Awards winners
Zee Cine Awards winners